Arsina is a monotypic moth genus in the family Erebidae. Its only species, Arsina silenalis is found on the Indian Ocean islands of Réunion, Aldabra and Madagascar. Both the genus and the species were first described by Achille Guenée in 1862.

References

Erebidae
Moths of Seychelles
Moths of Réunion
Moths of Madagascar
Moths described in 1862
Monotypic moth genera